Sami Saeed al-Ahmad 1930–2006 (Arabic:سامي سعيد الاحمد) was a historian in Ancient history of the Middle east.  He was born in 1930 in Hillah (previous  known as Babylon and now it is called Babil), Iraq, where he had received primary and secondary education, and in 1953 received a bachelor's degree in history from the University of Baghdad, and a point well in his career, including the University of Chicago received a master's degree in 1957 and doctorate from the University of Michigan in 1962, he was appointed professor at the University of Denver in Colorado in America in 1963 -1967.
He returned to Iraq in the late sixties and was appointed professor at Baghdad University, has more than thirty books printed in Arabic and English, including the south of Iraq in time of the UNESCO King Banipal (commonly known as Assure-bani-pal), Yazidis, and the history of the Persian Gulf in the oldest times, the island languages.

Invited by the University of Michigan he has been Professor of Ancient History since the late nineties.

Sami Alahmed got married in 1964 In denver Colorado from Ibtihaj Omer Taher (1945–2008) and has two sons (Toney Ahmed and Marwan Ahmed) and two girls (Emiley Wynn and Dina Jabra). All of his kids live in the United States of America except Marwan who preferred to stay in the home country (Iraq).

Sami Al Ahmed had a stroke and died several days later on March 6, 2006.

Works
 Aḥmad, Sāmī Saʻīd.  Ḥaḍārāt al-waṭan al-ʻArabī al-qadīmah asāsān lil-ḥaḍārah al-Yūnānīyah /  2002  Book  1
 Aḥmad, Sāmī Saʻīd.  Samīrāmīs /  1989  Book  2
 Aḥmad, Sāmī Saʻīd.  Tārīkh al-Khalīj al-ʻArabī min aqdam al-azminah ḥattá al-taḥrīr al-ʻArabī /  1985  Book  3
 Gilgamesh. Arabic & Akkadian.  Malḥamat Gilgāmish /  1984  Book  4
 Aḥmad, Sāmī Saʻīd.  al-Madkhal ilá tārīkh al-ʻālam al-qadīm /  1983  Book  5
 Aḥmad, Sāmī Saʻīd.  al-Madkhal ilá dirāsat tārīkh al-lughāt al-Jazarīyah /  1981  Book  6
 Aḥmad, Sāmī Saʻīd.  Ḥaḍārāt al-waṭan al-ʻArabī ka-khalfīyah lil-madanīyah al-Yūnānīyah /  1980  Book  7
 Lloyd, Seton.  Āthār bilād al-Rāfidayn min al-ʻaṣr al-ḥajarī al-qadīm ḥattá al-iḥtilāl al-Fār  1980  Book  8
 Aḥmad, Sāmī Saʻīd.  Tārīkh Filasṭīn al-qadīm /  1979  Book  9
 Aḥmad, Sāmī Saʻīd.  al-Sūmirīyūn wa-turāthuhum al-ḥaḍārī /  1975  Book  10
 Aḥmad, Sāmī Saʻīd.  al-Yazīdīyah: aḥwāluhum wa-muʻtaqadātuhum /  1975  Book  11
 Aḥmad, Sāmī Saʻīd.  al-Ālih Zūwus : muqaddimah fī dirāsat al-iʻtiqād bi-Zūwus ḥattá iḍmiḥlāl Rūmā /  1970  Book 12

References

External links
 
 Biography and Scientific of Dr. Sami Saeed Al-Ahmad on Journal of University of Babylon for Humanities (JUBH)

20th-century Iraqi historians
1930 births
Iraqi emigrants to the United States
University of Baghdad alumni
University of Chicago alumni
University of Michigan alumni
University of Denver faculty
University of Michigan faculty
2006 deaths